Argopecten irradians, formerly classified as Aequipecten irradians, common names Atlantic bay scallop or bay scallop, is a species of scallop in the family Pectinidae.  An edible saltwater clam, it is native to the northwest Atlantic from Cape Cod to the Gulf of Mexico.

Biology

Development
At the northern extreme of its range in Massachusetts germ and gonial cells complete development in winter and early spring according to Sastry 1970. At the southern extreme the timeline is very different with Barber & Blake 1983 finding cytoplasmic growth stages occurred in July in Tarpon Springs, Florida, almost at the highest water temperature of the year.

Immunity
 is a peptidoglycan recognition protein (PGRP). Its cDNA was cloned by Ni et al. 2007 and is the first bivalve PGRP to be cloned.  is a galectin discovered by Song et al. 2010,  is a toll-like receptor (TLR) shared with other bivalves. It was first found in this scallop by Song et al. 2006. Song 2006 also found an inhibitor of κB (IκB).  is the first big defensin cloned from this scallop. The gene is 531 nucleotides and the polypeptide product is 122 amino acids. Recombinant AiBD is an antimicrobial for Gram-positive bacteria, Gram-negative bacteria, and fungi. Manganese superoxide dismutase (MnSOD) mRNA expression increases in the gill and mantle in response to Vibrio anguillarum.

Bay scallop fishery
This species of scallop used to support a large wild fishery on the East Coast of the United States, but since the 1950s it has decreased greatly. This is apparently the result of several negative influences, one of which is a reduction in sea grasses (to which bay scallop spat attach) due to increased coastal development and concomitant nutrient runoff.
By contrast, the Atlantic sea scallop (Placopecten magellanicus) is at historically high levels of abundance because the Magnuson-Stevens Fishery Conservation and Management Reauthorization Act of 2006 put a limit on catch numbers and lead to a recovery from overfishing.

Scallop aquaculture is currently being practiced in Florida.  They were introduced into China in the 1980s and are the basis of a vibrant aquaculture industry in that country and attempted elsewhere.

Subspecies
This species has five different subspecies: 
 A. i. amplicostatus (Dall, 1898) 
 A. i. concentricus (Say, 1822) 
 A. i. irradians (Lamarck, 1819) 
 A. i. sablensis (Clarke, 1965) - a fossil subspecies
 A. i. taylorae Petuch, 1987 - the southern bay scallop

References

 https://www.mindat.org/taxon-2285856.html

irradians
Bivalves described in 1819
Taxa named by Jean-Baptiste Lamarck
Molluscs of the Atlantic Ocean